El Rito is an unincorporated community in Cibola County, New Mexico, United States. El Rito is located approximately two miles southeast of Mesita on the Laguna Reservation. It is located on the north bank of the Rio San Jose and was named after the creek.

Notes

Unincorporated communities in Cibola County, New Mexico
Unincorporated communities in New Mexico